Anne Petersen may refer to:

 Anne C. Petersen (born 1944), American psychologist
 Anne Helen Petersen, American writer and journalist